Eudonia chlamydota is a moth in the family Crambidae. It was named by Edward Meyrick in 1884. It is endemic to New Zealand.

The wingspan is 13–14 mm. The forewings are ochreous-whitish, the basal half suffused with blackish. The hindwings are whitish, but the postmedian line and apical suffusion are faintly grey. Adults have been recorded on wing in January.

References

Moths described in 1884
Eudonia
Moths of New Zealand
Endemic fauna of New Zealand
Taxa named by Edward Meyrick
Endemic moths of New Zealand